Megalaspidella is an extinct genus from a well-known class of fossil marine arthropods, the trilobites. It lived during the later part of the Arenig stage of the Ordovician Period, approximately 478 to 471 million years ago.

References 

Asaphida genera
Asaphidae
Ordovician trilobites of Asia
Fossils of China
Ordovician trilobites of Europe
Fossils of France
Ordovician trilobites of North America
Fossils of the United States
Ordovician trilobites of South America
Fossils of Argentina
Fossils of Bolivia
Fossil taxa described in 1937